Laver is a ghost town located about 15 km southwest of Vidsel and 50 km west of Älvsbyn in Sweden which existed between 1936 and 1947. It was a mining community where copper was extracted. About 350 people lived there at most. The operations of the Laver mine ended on 4 November 1946.

Further reading

External links
Laver – ett gruvsamhälle med kort livslängd
Lavergruvan

Ghost towns in Europe
Copper mines in Sweden
Mining communities in Sweden
Geography of Norrbotten County
Former populated places in Sweden